is a 2006 combat flight simulation video game developed and published by Namco for the PlayStation 2. Part of the Ace Combat series, the game was first released outside of Japan by the newly formed Namco Bandai Games. Set in the Ace Combat series' fictional universe of Strangereal, the game's story takes place before the events of most other entries in the series, and follows the actions of "Galm Team", a mercenary fighter squadron led by the player character "Cipher", as they fight to repel an enemy invasion during the titular Belkan War, a World War II-esque conflict that was mentioned but not elaborated upon in previous entries.

Ace Combat Zero, like the rest of the Ace Combat series, has a more arcade-like format compared to other flight simulation games. Its mechanics are a mixture of features from its predecessors, Ace Combat 04: Shattered Skies and Ace Combat 5: The Unsung War, with the addition of a unique reputation system that affects the player's progression and how the story is told.

The game received mixed but generally positive reception on release, with praise toward its plot, graphics, and refined game mechanics compared to its predecessors, but criticism toward its lack of innovation and melodramatic storytelling.

Gameplay

Ace Combat Zeros gameplay is split into a single-player campaign mode and a two-player versus mode. The mechanics themselves are a mix of features from Ace Combat 04 and Ace Combat 5.

The game features primarily older versions of fighter aircraft seen in its predecessors, such as the F-15C, F/A-18C, and several second- and third-generation fighters such as the Saab 35 Draken. The player begins the game with an F-5E, an F-1, and a J35J, but is able to unlock and purchase more advanced aircraft by completing missions and destroying targets to earn credits. The game introduces the fictional ADFX-01 Morgan superfighter (which resembles the cancelled PZL-230 Skorpion attack aircraft), but players can also access the ADF-01 FALKEN from Ace Combat 2 (the Morgan's successor) and the X-02 Wyvern from Ace Combat 04.

The game revives Ace Combat 04s aircraft customization system. Players can purchase up to three special weapons per plane (including air-to-surface missiles and thermobaric bombs), but can only choose one per mission. Another returning feature from Ace Combat 04 is the ability to withdraw from the battlefield to re-arm at an allied airbase during long missions.

Zero retains Ace Combat 5s wingman command system. During most campaign missions, the player can issue orders to the AI wingman using the DualShock controller's D-pad. The game also marks the return of the ability to pick each wingman's armament, though the ability to pick their aircraft itself remains absent.

The game continues the series tradition of taking on enemy aces who fly aircraft with unique paint schemes. Aside from pilots the player faces as boss characters, many missions have other enemy aces scattered throughout the game map; defeating them will list their unique plane and short pilot biographies in an in-game digital album.

Ace Style
A unique element of Ace Combat Zero is the Ace Style system, a reputation system that greatly affects gameplay. The player's Ace Style is affected by the player's actions during the campaign; for example, if the player shoots down a crippled aircraft, destroys a surrendering enemy, or attacks a neutral or non-combatant entity (all marked by yellow icons, as opposed to red and green for enemies and blue for allies), their Ace Style will change, as it will in a vice-versa scenario where the player spares them or simply leaves them alone. A horizontal bar with three boxes marked "Mercenary", "Soldier", and "Knight" is shown in mission debriefings, and depending on the player's conduct, the bar will slide toward one of these three boxes.

The player's Ace Style determines radio chatter, which enemy ace squadrons the player encounters, and which FMV cutscenes play. Different Aces earn different planes, and at the end of the game, color schemes representing each fighting style will be unlocked for each acquired plane.
Mercenary Aces are pilots who destroy the opposition without mercy and are not concerned about their own allies. Players who kill all targets in a mission, hostile or not, and ignore allied support requests will see their ranking bar go left.
Soldier Aces are pilots who can fight as circumstances permit and change the flow of battle. This ranking is achieved by destroying some non-hostile targets while sparing others, and accepting some requests for support.
Knight Aces are pilots who believe in fighting fair during the battle and protecting the weak. Players can attain this ranking by coming to the aid of allied units and not destroying non-hostile targets, which will result in the bar going right.

Synopsis

Setting 
Ace Combat Zero is set in the series' fictional universe of Strangereal, where Earth has entirely different nations, geography, and history. Unlike most other entries in the series, Zero is set before the 1999 Ulysses incident, where an asteroid struck the Earth, sparking mass destabilization and international tensions. Rather, the game's story is set during the Belkan War in 1995, when the Principality of Belka, suffering from an economic crisis, invades several of its immediate neighbors (most of which were former provinces of Belka itself) on the continent of Osea after the discovery of valuable resources in their territories. Belka is opposed by the Allied Forces, an international military coalition consisting of the Osean Federation, Sapin, Yuktobania, and other Osean countries and former Belkan territories. One of the first countries to be invaded, Ustio, is quickly overwhelmed and hires mercenaries for their defense; the campaign follows one of these mercenary units, the "Galm Team" squadron led by the player character, a fighter pilot that goes by the callsign "Cipher". Cipher's wingman, Larry Foulke, goes by the callsign "Pixy". An additional wingman, an Osean pilot named Patrick James "PJ" Beckett, joins Galm Team later in the conflict.

The game's plot is told in retrospective, in the form of a television documentary about Galm Team and the Belkan War, broadcast a decade after the events of the game. The player's actions and Ace Style affect how the documentary is told and who is interviewed in the cutscenes.

Plot 
In 1995, Belka launches an invasion of its neighbors, and much of Ustio, a resource-rich country bordering Belka, falls to Belka's advance and the might of its air force. The Ustian government hires mercenaries to offset the Belkan advantage; one of these, Galm Team, consisting of mercenary fighter pilots Cipher and Pixy, turns the tide of the war and narrowly saves Ustio from total defeat. Ustio is liberated with the help of Galm Team, and the Allied Forces soon begin their counteroffensive into Belka.

Galm Team, now joined by Osean pilot PJ, continues to assist the Allied Forces as they push into Belkan territory. Cipher gains recognition after successfully destroying a Belkan anti-aircraft laser installation, but Pixy becomes disillusioned with the war when Galm Team is ordered to support the indiscriminate bombing of a Belkan city. Unable to stop the Allied advance, the Belkans detonate seven nuclear weapons on their own soil in a desperate attempt to halt the Allied invasion, killing thousands of civilians. While a ceasefire is ordered by the Allied Forces, Pixy deserts Galm Team, nearly killing Cipher in the confusion.

Following the detonations, the Belkan government accepts surrender and its territories are divided between the coalition forces. Debates ensue among the Allied Forces over territory, and ultranationalist and anarchist defectors alike, including Pixy, form "A World With No Boundaries", a Posadist terrorist organization intent on erasing national borders, believing they are the primary cause of conflict and strife; to bring about their utopia, they plan to use nuclear weapons against nations across the world. Galm Team is deployed to eliminate the terrorists, culminating in the siege of a fortified dam that houses Belkan ICBMs. Galm Team successfully destroys the launch control mechanisms, but PJ is killed by Pixy flying a laser-armed prototype aircraft linked to the ICBMs, which Pixy activates before challenging Cipher to a final duel. After a protracted dogfight, Pixy is shot down by Cipher, disabling the ICBMs and ending the terrorist threat.

With the end of the Belkan War, peace returns to the Osean continent, but Belkan nationalists secretly plot their revenge. Cipher is mentioned to have vanished after the conflict, with no records of his fate, personal information, or current whereabouts. The documentary ends with an interview with a reformed Pixy, who is revealed to have survived being shot down and is now fighting for the ISAF during the Continental War. After musing on his experiences, Pixy thanks Cipher for serving alongside him, and expresses his hopes that they will meet again.

Reception

The game received positive reviews. It holds a 75/100 score on Metacritic. As of January 2008, it has shipped 792,000 copies worldwide.

IGN's Juan Castro graded the game at 8.8/10, stating that Namco took a chance in slowly evolving the series, and that it offers "slight modifications" in the engine. He also noted the story as being different from other console flight games and praised the cooperative mode.

Computer and Video Games lauded the game's release date as a refresher from the multiple games of different genres that came out at the time. He noted the good graphical presentations and the sheer difficulty provided by the aces.

Eurogamer's Rob Fahey, however, said the game's "incremental" changes confuse players with what changed between Zero and Unsung War.

Notes

References

External links

Official website

2006 video games
Ace Combat
Combat flight simulators
PlayStation 2 games
PlayStation 2-only games
Video game prequels
Multiplayer and single-player video games
Anti-war video games
Video games developed in Japan
Video games set in 1988
Video games set in 1991
Video games set in 1995